District of Columbia v. Wesby, 583 U.S. ___ (2018), was a United States Supreme Court case in which the Court held that police officers had probable cause to arrest those attending a party in Washington, D.C.

Facts and procedural history
In March 2008, police officers in Washington, D.C. were called to a residence due to noise complaints. When asked, guests gave conflicting reasons for why they were in the residence, and the homeowner ultimately indicated he had not given permission for the party and that the party's host, "Peaches", had not yet signed a lease for the residence. Though the 21 attendees were arrested, charges were later dropped.

A jury later awarded those arrested $680,000 in damage, and the U.S. Court of Appeals for the D.C. Circuit determined that the arresting officers did not have immunity from legal repercussions for the arrests. The Supreme Court reversed and remanded this decision, and held that the officers had probable cause to arrest the party attendees and were entitled to qualified immunity.

See also
 List of United States Supreme Court cases
 List of United States Supreme Court cases, volume 583
 List of United States Supreme Court cases by the Roberts Court

References

External links
 

United States class action case law
United States Supreme Court cases
United States Supreme Court cases of the Roberts Court
2018 in United States case law